Jean Dubly (9 August 1886 – 21 November 1953) was a French footballer. He competed in the men's tournament at the 1908 Summer Olympics.

References

External links
 

1886 births
1953 deaths
French footballers
France international footballers
Olympic footballers of France
Footballers at the 1908 Summer Olympics
Sportspeople from Tourcoing
Association football defenders
Footballers from Hauts-de-France
RC Roubaix players